The following is a timeline of the history of the city of Denver, Colorado, United States from its founding in 1858 to the present.

19th century
 1858
 Denver City founded in Kansas Territory.
 Prospect Hill Cemetery established.
 1859
 Rocky Mountain News begins publication.
 John C. Moore becomes mayor.
 1861 – Denver City becomes part of Colorado Territory.
 1863
 Telegraph begins operating.
 Fire destroys much of Downtown and results in laws requiring new buildings to be made of brick.
 1864

 University of Denver founded.
 Cherry Creek floods destroying city records.
 1867
 Capital of Colorado Territory relocated to Denver City from Golden City.
 Colorado Tribune newspaper begins publication.
 1870
 Cheyenne-Denver and Kansas-Denver trains begin operating.
 Denver City Water Company formed.
 1871 – Denver Horse Railroad begins operating.
 1872 – Police department established.
 1873 – Palace Theater opens.
 1875 – East High School opens.
 1876
 Denver becomes part of new State of Colorado.
 Riverside Cemetery established.
 1878 – Central Presbyterian Church built.
 1879 – State Historical and Natural History Society of Colorado headquartered in Denver.
 1881
 Union Station and Tabor Grand Opera House open.
 City Park and Fortnightly Club established.
 1882
 Colorado Scientific Society headquartered in Denver.
 High Line Canal opens. 
 1883 – First St. Patrick's Day parade held.
 1884 – Denver Press Club and Denver Athletic Club founded.
 1886
 Denver Union Stockyards established.
 Denver Tramway and Mercantile Library begin operating.
 "Ugly law" effected.
 1887
 College of the Sacred Heart relocates to Denver.
 Central Business College established.
 1889
 Soapy Smith assaults and injures Rocky Mountain News editor John Arkins. The News declares a crusade to rid Denver of the bad man, which took a decade to complete.
 Woodworth's Shorthand College established.
 Denver Athletic Club's historic clubhouse is built.
 1890
 Elitch Gardens amusement venue opens.
 Masonic Temple built.
 1891
 Colorado Camera Club formed.
 Central Presbyterian Church built.
 Brown Palace Hotel built.
 1892
 Evening Post newspaper begins publication.
 Brown Palace Hotel built.
 1893
 Denver Depression begins.
 Denver Artists Club founded.
 1894 – Colorado State Capitol building opens.
 1895
 Festival of Mountain and Plain begins.
 Denver Instrument Company in business.
 Students' School of Art established.
 1896 – Denver Zoo founded.
 1897 – Denver Musicians Association founded.
 1898 – Denver Public Library established.
 1899
 Washington Park developed.
 National Jewish Health opens.

20th century

1900s–1940s
 1902 – Denver government home rule established.
 1903 – Denver Juvenile Court established.
 1904
 Robert W. Speer becomes mayor.
 Barnes Commercial School established.
 Denver and Interurban Rail Road (Boulder-Denver) chartered.
 1906
 National Western Stock Show begins.
 Red Rocks Amphitheatre opens near city.
 Municipal code adopted.
 U.S. Denver Mint begins operating.
 1907 – Mammoth Roller Skating Rink, and Denver and South Platte Railway open.
 1908
 July: 1908 Democratic National Convention.
 Municipal Auditorium opens.
 Colorado Museum of Natural History built.
 Denver Motor Club organized.
 1910 – Daniels & Fisher Tower built.
Dumb Friends League established.
 1911
 Cathedral Basilica of the Immaculate Conception built.
 Mountain States Telephone & Telegraph Company in business.
 1912 – Civic League of Denver and University of Colorado's Extension Center established.
 1915
 Cheesman Park opens.

 Denver Tourist Bureau active.
 1916
 Griffith Opportunity School and Garden Club of Denver founded.
 Post Office built.
 1918
 Denver Water (public utility) and Federal Reserve Bank branch established.
 Denver Art Museum opens.
 1919 – Civic Center park and Ogden Theatre open.
 1920
 August: Tramway strike.
 Fitzsimmons Army Hospital built.
 1922 – December 18: Denver Mint Robbery.
 1923
 Benjamin F. Stapleton becomes mayor.
 Stover Candies in business.
 Colorado Municipal League headquartered in Denver.
 1924 – Glenarm YMCA opens.
 1925 – Denver Foundation established.
 1927 – Santa Fe Theatre opens. 
 1929 – Denver Municipal Airport begins operating.
 1930
 Paramount Theatre opens.
 U.S. Customhouse built.
 1932 – City and County Building constructed.
 1934 – Denver Symphony Orchestra established.
 1938 – U.S. Lowry Air Force Base established.
 1941 – Denver Ordnance Plant begins operating.
 1948 – Bears Stadium opens.

1950s–2000s

 1950 – Cherry Cricket restaurant in business.
 1951
 Denver Coliseum opens

 Botanical Gardens Foundation incorporated.
 Joshel House (residence) built.
 1952 – American Civil Liberties Union headquartered in city.
 1955 – Denver Regional Council of Governments formed.
 1956 – KRMA-TV begins broadcasting.
 1960 – Denver Broncos football team active.
 1965 – Metropolitan State University of Denver established.
 1966 – Tropical Conservatory opens in the Botanic Gardens.
 1967
Community College of Denver established.
On August 9 a 5.3 Mb earthquake affected the Denver area with a maximum Mercalli intensity of VII (Very strong). This was the largest in a swarm of over 300 events that spanned more than a year. Damage was focused in the Northglenn area where walls were cracked, windows were broken, and structural elements were damaged at a church.
 1968
 William H. McNichols, Jr. becomes mayor.
 1969 – Chicano Youth Liberation Conference held.
 1970
 Negative income tax program begins.
 Historic Denver nonprofit founded.
 Population: 514,678.
 1971
 The Denver Tramway company ceases being operator of the city's transit system, transferring all assets to Denver Metro Transit (later folded into the Regional Transportation District)
 People's Fair begins.
 Black American West Museum founded.
 1972 – November: Voters reject city bid for the 1976 Winter Olympics.
 1973
 University of Colorado's School of Public Affairs and Children's Museum of Denver established.
 Patricia Schroeder becomes U.S. representative for Colorado's 1st congressional district.
 1974 – University of Colorado Denver established.
 1975 – Steele Gallery founded.
 1976 – PrideFest (Denver) begins.
 1977 – Denver Young Artists Orchestra founded.
 1978
 Colorado Food Clearing House established.
 Denver Film Festival, and South Platte Greenway development begins.
 Boettcher Concert Hall built.
 1979 – Denver Firefighters Museum established.
 1980
 Lucile's Creole Cafe in business.
 Population: 492,365.
 1981
 Quiznos restaurant in business.
 Opera Colorado; and Museum of Miniatures founded.
 1982 – 16th Street Mall (pedestrian way) opens.
 1983 – Federico Peña becomes mayor.
 1984
 Colorado Coalition for the Homeless headquartered in Denver.
 Republic Plaza built.
 Wings Over the Rockies Air and Space Museum (formerly The Lowry Heritage Museum) opened.
 1985 – Denver Urban Gardens nonprofit and Avenue Theater established.
 1986 – Denver Enterprise Zone established by state legislature.
 1988 – Wynkoop Brewing Company in business.
 1989 – Byers-Evans House Museum established.
 1990
 Colorado Convention Center opens.
 Population: 467,610.
 1991
 Wellington Webb becomes mayor.
 Museo de las Americas founded.
 National Renewable Energy Laboratory established near city.
 1993
 August: Catholic Pope John Paul II visits city.
 Chipotle Mexican Grill in business.
 5280 magazine begins publication.
 Molly Brown House restoration begins.
 1994 – Rocky Mountain Media Watch founded.
 1995
 Denver International Airport begins operating.
 Coors Field opens.
 Zuma restaurant in business.
 First Fridays of the Golden Triangle Museum District begin.
 1997
 June: 23rd G8 summit held.
 City website online (approximate date).
 Denver Underground Film Festival begins.
 Diana DeGette becomes U.S. representative for Colorado's 1st congressional district.
 1998
 January 25: Denver Broncos win Super Bowl football contest.
 December 20: Airplane crash.
 Dikeou Collection (art gallery) established.
 1999 – Pepsi Center arena and Colorado's Ocean Journey aquarium open.
 June 21, 1999 a tremendous opening and soon earned accreditation by the Association of Zoos and Aquariums (AZA), the Downtown Aquarium in Denver is owned and operated by Landry's Restaurants, Inc.
 
 2000 – Privacy Foundation headquartered in Denver (approximate date).

21st century

2000s
 2001 
 First Look Film Festival begins.
 Mizuna restaurant in business.
 2003 – John Hickenlooper is elected Mayor of Denver.
 2004 – Rioja restaurant in business.
 2005
 Marijuana legalization.
 2006
 Colorado T-REX Project (TRansportation EXpansion) completed.
 Telemundo Denver begins broadcasting.
 2008
 August 6–10: 66th World Science Fiction Convention held.
 August 25–28: 2008 Democratic National Convention held..
 Education News Colorado begins publication.
 Denhac nonprofit founded.
 2009 – I-News investigative news nonprofit founded.

2010s
 2010
 B-cycle bikeshare launched.
 DaVita Inc. relocates to Denver.
 Population: 600,158; metro 2,543,482.
 2011
 January 12: Bill Vidal becomes mayor.
 May 3: Denver mayoral election, 2011 held.
 July 18: Michael Hancock becomes mayor.
 StoryCorps interviews conducted.
 Linger restaurant in business.
 Clyfford Still museum opens.
 2012
 History Colorado Center opens.
 Denver Comic Con begins.
 November 6: 2012 Colorado Amendment 64 legalizing Cannabis for personal use.
 2013 – Population: 649,495.
 2017 – January 21: Women's protest against U.S. president Trump.

2020s
 2021 – December 27: A gunman goes on a shooting spree across the Denver metropolitan area, killing five and injuring two before dying in a shootout with police.

See also
 History of Denver
 List of mayors of Denver
 Timeline of Colorado history
 Timelines of other cities in Colorado: Aurora, Boulder, Colorado Springs

References

Bibliography

Published in 19th century
 
 
 
 
 
 1890
 1897

Published in 20th century
 History of Denver, by Jerome C. Smiley, 1901
 
 
 
 
 
 
 
 
 
 
 
 
 
 
  (fulltext via Open Library)

Published in 21st century

External links

 Items related to Denver, various dates (via Digital Public Library of America)

 
Denver
denver
Years in Colorado